Tired Creek is a stream in the U.S. state of Georgia. It is a tributary to the Ochlockonee River.

Tired Creek was so named on account of the stream's slow current.

References

Rivers of Georgia (U.S. state)
Rivers of Grady County, Georgia